Ibrahim Ali Bahsoun (born 1 January 1989) is a Lebanese footballer who plays as a forward.

Club career
On 8 February 2013, Bahsoun joined Iraqi Premier League club Al-Zawraa. In January 2016, Bahsoun moved to Jordanian Pro League side Al-Baqa'a.

On 21 June 2021, Bahsoun moved to Persik Kediri in the Indonesian Liga 1. He made his debut on 27 August, as a starter in a 1–0 defeat to Bali United; he was subbed out in the 40th minute. Bahsoun's contract was ended on 2 November, after having played only two league games; the club cited family reasons behind the player's departure.

Honours
Nejmeh
 Lebanese Premier League: 2013–14
 Lebanese Elite Cup runner-up: 2013

Safa
 Lebanese Elite Cup runner-up: 2014

References

External links

 
 
 
 

1989 births
Living people
People from Tyre District
Lebanese footballers
Association football forwards
Tadamon Sour SC players
Nejmeh SC players
Al-Zawraa SC players
Safa SC players
Al-Baqa'a Club players
Al Nabi Chit SC players
AC Tripoli players
Akhaa Ahli Aley FC players
Persik Kediri players
Lebanese Premier League players
Iraqi Premier League players
Jordanian Pro League players
Liga 1 (Indonesia) players
Lebanese expatriate footballers
Lebanese expatriate sportspeople in Iraq
Lebanese expatriate sportspeople in Jordan
Lebanese expatriate sportspeople in Indonesia
Expatriate footballers in Iraq
Expatriate footballers in Jordan
Expatriate footballers in Indonesia